The McKinley Bridge is a steel truss bridge across the Mississippi River. It connects northern portions of the city of St. Louis, Missouri with Venice, Illinois. It opened in 1910 and was taken out of service on October 30, 2001. The bridge was reopened for pedestrian and bicyclists on November 17, 2007  with a grand re-opening celebration. Since December 2007, McKinley has been open to vehicular traffic as well. It is accessible from Illinois Route 3 in Illinois and from the intersection of Salisbury and North 9th Street in the city of St. Louis. The bridge carried both railroad and vehicular traffic across the Mississippi River for decades.  By 1978, the railroad line over the span was closed, and an additional set of lanes was opened for vehicles in the inner roadway.

The McKinley Bridge was the first alignment of U.S. Route 66 across the Mississippi.  It is commonly assumed that the bridge was named for President William McKinley; but in reality, it was named for the builder, William B. McKinley, chief executive of the Illinois Traction System interurban electric railway, which accessed St. Louis via the bridge.

Usage 
The current alignment of the bridge carries two lanes of traffic on the inner lanes. The outer lane on the north side of the bridge will become an exclusive service lane, while the outer lane on the south side of the bridge will become a sidewalk and bike path. It is expected to carry 14,000 vehicles across the river daily, but total traffic across the river increased in 2014 by 7.4% over 2013 levels, and in April 2014, it was estimated that 17,000 vehicles use it daily.

History 
The designer of the bridge was Polish-American engineer Ralph Modjeski. It was constructed by Missouri Valley Bridge & Iron Co. and Pennsylvania Steel Co.  When the US Highway System was instituted in 1926, the McKinley Bridge carried the famous Route 66 across the Mississippi River for four years until a new alignment took the route over Chain of Rocks Bridge in order to avoid leading traffic directly into the downtown St. Louis area. The Chain of Rocks Bridge was famous for having a curve in the middle. It is now open to pedestrians.

The bridge was owned by the city of Venice, Illinois and operated as a toll bridge. After decades of disrepair due to the lack of toll revenues, the McKinley Bridge was closed in 2001.

The state of Illinois attempted to provide money to the city of Venice for repairing the bridge, but was unable to do so because of the outstanding taxes owed by the city.  As a result, the City of St. Louis foreclosed on the bridge, delaying reconstruction efforts further. In an agreement reached in June 2003, the states of Illinois and Missouri agreed to take over ownership of the bridge from the city of Venice.

Rehabilitation began in 2004 and the original plans for the repairs anticipated a re-opening in late 2005. However, the date was pushed back due to the addition of The Great Rivers Greenway Bikeway tie-in.

See also 
 
 
 
 
 List of crossings of the Upper Mississippi River
 List of road-rail bridges
 Martin Luther King Bridge
 Eads Bridge
 Poplar Street Bridge
 Stan Musial Veterans Memorial Bridge

References

External links 
 IDOT:McKinley Bridge Structure Reconstruction Project 
 McKinley Bridge Mississippi River Crossing At St. Louis
 Historic Bridges of the U.S. | McKinley Bridge

Road bridges in Illinois
Bridges over the Mississippi River
Bridges completed in 1910
Bridges on U.S. Route 66
Metro East
Pedestrian bridges in Illinois
Bridges in St. Louis
Road bridges in Missouri
Pedestrian bridges in Missouri
Road-rail bridges in the United States
Former toll bridges in Illinois
Former toll bridges in Missouri
U.S. Route 66 in Missouri
U.S. Route 66 in Illinois
Bridges of the United States Numbered Highway System
Steel bridges in the United States
Plate girder bridges in the United States
Bridges in Madison County, Illinois
1910 establishments in Illinois
1910 establishments in Missouri
Interstate vehicle bridges in the United States